Budhana is a town, block, tehsil, nagar panchayat, and one of the constituencies of the Uttar Pradesh Legislative Assembly in Muzaffarnagar district in Uttar Pradesh, India.

Demographics 
As of the 2001 India census, the town of Budhana had a population of 32,950. Males constitute 53% (17,416) of the population and females 47% (15,534). Budhana has an average literacy rate of 49%, lower than the national average of 59.5% with a male literacy rate of 57% and a female literacy rate of 40%. More than 18% of the population is under 6 years of age.

The total population of Budhana tehsil is 430,700 with 229,877 males and 200,823 females.

History 
Budhana is listed in the Ain-i-Akbari as a pargana under the sarkar of Saharanpur, producing a revenue of 3,698,041 dams for the imperial treasury and supplying a force of 300 infantry and 40 cavalry.

Notable residents 

 Nawazuddin Siddiqui

References

External links 
"Budhana" at Our Village India

Cities and towns in Muzaffarnagar district